Astral Taxi is the second and final album released by the Australian rock band Tin Tin, released in December 1971. It was produced by Billy Lawrie, and Maurice Gibb was the executive producer.

Track listing
All songs written by Steve Kipner and Steve Groves, except where noted.
Side one
"Astral Taxi" - 3:30
"Ships on the Starboard" (Steve Kipner, Steve Groves, Johnny Vallins) - 3:30
"Our Destiny" - 3:15
"Tomorrow Today" (Steve Kipner, Steve Groves, Billy Lawrie) - 3:50
"Jenny B." - 4:10
Side two
"I Took a Holiday" - 3:25
"Tag Around" - 2:25
"Set Sail for England" - 3:00
"The Cavalry's Coming" (Steve Kipner, Steve Groves, Johnny Vallins) - 2:45
"Benny the Wonder Dog" (Steve Kipner, Steve Groves, Johnny Vallins) - 4:00
"Is That the Way" (Steve Kipner, Steve Groves, Billy Lawrie) - 3:09

References

1971 albums
Tin Tin (band) albums
Albums produced by Maurice Gibb
Polydor Records albums
Atco Records albums